Clem Arnold Lawrence Arre (born September 2, 1971) is a Filipino comic book writer, artist and self-taught animator best known for his graphic novels The Mythology Class (1999) and Ang Mundo ni Andong Agimat (2006). He was born in Metro Manila, Philippines.

Biography
Arnold Arre has won National Book Awards from the Manila Critics Circle for his graphic novels The Mythology Class (1999), a four-part action-adventure miniseries and Trip to Tagaytay (2000), a one-shot future fiction short story. 

The Mythology Class, which blended ancient Philippine mythology with modern urban legends in a contemporary aesthetic, has been described as "genre-breaking", and has the distinction of being the first graphic novel to win in the Manila Critics Circle National Book Awards Comic Books category.

Arre's other titles include the romantic comedy After Eden (2002), Ang Mundo ni Andong Agimat (2006), and "Martial Law Babies" (2008).

Aside from his comics work, Arre did numerous design and illustration jobs for various clients such as the San Miguel Foundation for the Performing Arts and Sony BMG Music Entertainment Philippines. He also took part in local and international group exhibits and has had a one-man fantasy-themed show, Mythos in 2000.

In 2007, producer Tony Gloria of Unitel Productions optioned the film rights to Arre's novel Ang Mundo ni Andong Agimat. Arre has mentioned in an April 2014 interview that the project is still under development.

In 2011, Arre studied the art of animation and made a 4-minute short film titled Andong Agimat: Kanya ang Kalye based on the main character in his book Ang Mundo ni Andong Agimat. In November 2011 he was commissioned by Gang Badoy of Rock Ed Philippines and the National Historical Commission of the Philippines (NHCP) to make an animated music video for Kaninong Anino in celebration of the 150th birth anniversary of Filipino hero Jose Rizal. The following year, he was commissioned by Rock Ed Philippines and the NHCP to make an animated music video for Lupang Hinirang, the Philippine National Anthem which was broadcast on national television on June 12, 2012, Independence Day (Philippines). In September 2012, he did a series of educational animated videos titled Tandaan. Kalayaan. Alagaan. to mark the 40th anniversary of the Philippines' freedom from Martial Law. The series was commissioned by Rock Ed Philippines and the National Youth Commission (Philippines).

In July 2013, Arre finished his first 20-minute animated short film titled Milkyboy. The film went on to win awards at the 25th Gawad CCP Para Sa Alternatibong Pelikula in November 2013, the 7th Animahenasyon (Philippine Animation Festival) in November 2013, and the 30th Los Angeles Asian Pacific Film Festival (LAAPFF) in May 2014 where Arre was awarded the Linda Mabalot New Directors/New Visions Award, presented to a short film that demonstrates innovative and original use of cinematic language and vision.

Arre is based in Quezon City and is married to graphic designer Cynthia Bauzon.

Works

Animated films

Graphic novels
 Self-published

 Published by Adarna House

 Published by Nautilus Comics

 Commissioned Work
 Pencils, Inks and Colors for "Rodski Patotski: Ang Dalagang Baby" by Gerry Alanguilan (2014, Komikero Publishing) 
 Pencils, Inks, and Colors for "Stargazer" by Luis Katigbak (2014, The Philippine Star) 
 Pencils, Inks and Colors for La Perdida, Graphic Classics Volume 20: Western Classics (2010, Eureka Productions)
 Pencils, Inks and Colors for A Whisper in the Dark, Graphic Classics Volume 18:Louisa May Alcott (2009, Eureka Productions)
 Pencils, Inks and Colors The Wit of Porportuk, Graphic Classics Volume 2:Jack London (2006, Eureka Productions)
 Illustration for Graphic Classics:Sir Arthur Conan Doyle (2002, Eureka Productions)
 Illustration for Graphic Classics: H. P. Lovecraft (2002, Eureka Productions)
 Cover for Graphic Classics: Jack London volume 1 (2003, Eureka Productions)
 Pencils and Inks for Lastikman (2004, Mango Comics)
 Pencils and Inks for Baguio, 1966, Siglo: Freedom (2003/2004, Mango Comics) 
 21-page comic for Graphic Classics:Jack London volume 2 - The Wit of Porportuk (2006, Eureka Productions)
 Illustrated for Cast:Issue 10 by Jamie Bautista (2006, Nautilus Comics)
 Illustrated for Cast:Issue 11 by Jamie Bautista (2007, Nautilus Comics)
 Illustrated for Private Iris'

Design projects
 Album packaging illustration:

 Others:

Awards
 19th Manila Critics Circle National Book Awards (1999): Winner, Best Comic Book, The Mythology Class 20th Manila Critics Circle National Book Awards (2000): Winner, Best Comic Book, Trip to Tagaytay 22nd Manila Critics Circle National Book Awards (2002): Finalist, Best Comic Book, After Eden 25th Gawad CCP for Alternative Film and Video (2013): 1st Prize Winner, Animation Category, Milkyboy 7th  Animahenasyon (Philippine Animation Festival) (2013): Best Screenplay, Milkyboy 7th  Animahenasyon (Philippine Animation Festival) (2013): Special Jury Prize, Andong Agimat: Kanya ang Kalye 7th  Animahenasyon (Philippine Animation Festival) (2013): Best Music Video, Kaninong Anino 30th Los Angeles Asian Pacific Film Festival (2014): Winner, Linda Mabalot New Directors/New Visions Award, Milkyboy''

Exhibits
 Mythos (2000)- Crucible Gallery, SM Megamall
 Filipino Art and Artists Exhibition (2001)- Gallery 139, Glorietta 4
 Filipino Art and Artists Exhibition (2001)- San Francisco and New Jersey, USA
 Episode 3 Group Exhibit (2003)- Robinson's Galleria
 ROMIX Italian Comics Festival (2003)- Rome, Italy

Education
 St. Martin Technical Institute, Mandaluyong (1978–79)
 Lourdes School of Mandaluyong, Mandaluyong (1979–80)
 Cainta Catholic School, Cainta, Rizal (1980–89)
 University of the Philippines, Diliman, Quezon City (1989–94)

References

Publishers 
 Adarna House, publisher of After Eden and The Mythology Class Special Collected Edition
 Nautilus Comics, printer and distributor of Ang Mundo ni Andong Agimat

External links

Filipino writers
Filipino artists
Filipino illustrators
People from Quezon City
Writers from Metro Manila
Artists from Metro Manila
University of the Philippines Diliman alumni
Living people
1971 births